The 2000–01 Slovak 1.Liga season was the eighth season of the Slovak 1. Liga, the second level of ice hockey in Slovakia. 12 teams participated in the league, and MsHK Zilina won the championship.

Standings

External links
 Season on hockeyarchives.info

Slovak 1. Liga
Slovak 1. Liga seasons
Liga